Waldemar Rivera Torres (born December 31, 1969) is a Puerto Rican politician and former mayor of Villalba. Rivera is affiliated with the Popular Democratic Party (PPD) and served as mayor since 2005. He served for eight years before resigning for personal reasons.

References

External links
Waldemar Rivera Torres Profile on WAPA-TV

1969 births
Living people
Mayors of places in Puerto Rico
Popular Democratic Party (Puerto Rico) politicians
People from Villalba, Puerto Rico